Nelaug Station is a railway station located at the village of Nelaug in Åmli municipality in Agder county, Norway.  The station sits just north of the lake Nelaug.  The station functions as a meeting station of the Sørlandsbanen and Arendalsbanen railway lines.  The Arendalsbanen line is a branch line that runs from Nelaug to Arendal Station.  Passengers from Oslo to Arendal must change trains at Nelaug.  The station was opened on 10 November 1910, and in 1935, a new building was completed.

History
Since 1910, Nelaug was a stop for the (originally narrow gauged) Treungen Line that was opened to Åmli.  In 1935, the Sørland Line was finished from Oslo to Nelaug. At the same time the southern part of the Treungen Line was converted to standard gauge.  Also at that time, a new station building was completed at Nelaug by the architects Bjarne Friis Baastad and Gudmund Hoel. From 1935 to 1938, Arendal was the terminal station of the Sørland Line, just like Kragerø Station had been from 1927 to 1935. In 1938 the line from Nelaug to Kristiansand Station was opened.

The traffic on the northern section of the Treungen Line was closed in 1967. The entire community of Nelaug, including store and school, is built up around the train station.

References

Railway stations in Åmli
Railway stations on the Sørlandet Line
Railway stations on the Arendal Line
Railway stations opened in 1910
1910 establishments in Norway